Euparyphasma maxima is a moth in the family Drepanidae. It is found in China (Shaanxi, Zhejiang, Hubei, Hunan), Japan and the Korean Peninsula.

References

Moths described in 1888
Thyatirinae